General Jeong Seung-jo (born 23 May 1953) was a South Korean military officer and the 37th Chairman of the Joint Chiefs of Staff of the Republic of Korea Armed Forces.

Prior of his JCS Chairmanship, he was Deputy Commander, Republic of Korea - United States (ROK-US) Combined Forces Command.

References

1953 births
Living people
South Korean generals
Korea Military Academy alumni
Chairmen of the Joint Chiefs of Staff (South Korea)